Children of Vietnam is a humanitarian organization which helps poor and homeless children of the Da Nang area in Vietnam. The organization, established in 1998, is based in the United States.

The organization is sponsored by private citizens, corporations, churches and governmental bodies and promotes such programs, as Education Initiative (vocational training, scholarships, rural kindergarten construction, after school tutoring for street children and orphans), Nutrition Initiative (supplementing milk and food allotments to orphans and street children, agricultural support), Health & Well-being Initiative (introducing modern medical care, including a parasite remediation program, surgeries for children with orthopedic and heart complications, birth defects, and war-material injuries, sponsorship of prosthetic devices and wheelchairs, medical training and equipment supply, expertise to rural hospitals and clinics), Housing Initiative (building homes for destitute children).

In 2005, "Children of Vietnam" Foundation financed the disadvantaged children assistance program in Hai Chau District of Da Nang city, ensured scholarships to pupils of Tuong Lai special primary school, invested in health equipment for Hai Chau District Health Center.

By its own report, in 2006 the institution served 49,790 children.

References

External links
Children of Vietnam Home Page

This article is related to the List of non-governmental organizations in Vietnam.

1998 establishments in the United States
Foreign charities operating in Vietnam
Charities based in North Carolina
Child-related organizations in the United States
Organizations established in 1998